The ACW Heavyweight Championship was the top professional wrestling championship title in the American independent promotion Assault Championship Wrestling. The first-ever champion was Chris Hamrick who won the title in a championship tournament held in Meriden, Connecticut on August 24, 2001. The championship was regularly defended throughout the state of Connecticut, most often in Meriden, Connecticut, until the promotion closed in early-2004.

Dylan Kage holds the record for most reigns as the only 2-time champion. At 217 days, Chris Hamrick's reign is the longest in the title's history. Jeff Rocket's reign, which lasted only 4 days before vacating due to injury, was the shortest in the history of the title. Overall, there have been 9 reigns shared between 8 wrestlers, with one vacancy.

Title history

Reigns

References

External links
Official ACW Heavyweight Championship Title History
ACW Heavyweight Championship at WrestlingData.com

Heavyweight wrestling championships